Andrew Harold Giuliani (born January 30, 1986) is an American political commentator and golfer. He was a special assistant to the President and associate director of the Office of Public Liaison, during the Trump administration. He is the son of former mayor of New York City Rudy Giuliani. Giuliani was a contributor for the conservative media channel Newsmax TV.

In May 2021, Giuliani announced that he would be running for governor of New York in 2022. He did not field a candidate for lieutenant governor. He went on to lose the 2022 Republican gubernatorial primary to Lee Zeldin by a significant margin.

Early life and education
Giuliani was born to Rudy Giuliani and Donna Hanover in 1986. He has one sister, Caroline.

His father was elected mayor of New York City in 1993. When his father took the oath of office, Andrew repeated parts of the oath along with his father. Andrew was exuberant on the podium beside his father, blowing the cameras kisses, mimicking each of his father's hand gestures, and shouting: "It should be so and it will be so!" The moment was lampooned by comedian Chris Farley on Saturday Night Live.

In October 2000, his father filed for divorce, which was finalized in July 2002. His mother was awarded custody.

Giuliani attended Saint Joseph Regional High School in Montvale, New Jersey, graduating in 2005. Giuliani studied marketing, management, and sociology at Duke University graduating in May 2009 with a Bachelor of Arts degree. After college, Giuliani worked as a sales intern at CapRok Capital in Rye, New York.

Golf
Giuliani played golf in high school, and lettered all four years. In June 2001, at 15 years of age, he played in the pro-am at the Buick Classic at the Westchester Country Club, partnered with world #1 Tiger Woods. His father, Rudy Giuliani, was originally scheduled to play with Woods, but could not because of a sore left foot. Despite his inability to play, Rudy Giuliani ensured that he was present for the entire round, by either walking together with his son and Woods, or riding in a golf cart a few meters away from them to protect his left foot.

Giuliani was recruited to Duke by golf coach Rod Myers, although Myers died shortly after, and a new coach, O.D. Vincent, was appointed. In February 2008, while Giuliani was a junior, he was cut from the team for breaches of discipline, which he said were minor or fabricated infractions: gunning the engine of his car as he left a parking lot, breaking a club, and throwing an apple at a teammate.

Although Giuliani was already cut from the team, Vincent agreed to reinstate him if the rest of the team voted for it. On April 9, 2008, five of Giuliani's teammates sent him a jointly signed email stating, "[a]fter careful consideration we have come to the unanimous decision that we wish that your involvement with the Duke Golf Team is terminated. We have appreciated your time with us but feel that this is the best decision for all parties involved."

In July 2008, Giuliani sued the university, alleging that his golf coach "manufactured accusations against him to justify kicking him off the team to whittle the squad." He further claimed that the university, by way of the late Rod Myers, had already verbally promised him a spot on the Blue Devils and “life-time access” to Duke golf facilities. The lawsuit was dismissed in 2010.

Giuliani turned pro at the beginning of 2009. In August of that year he won the Metropolitan Open, earning $27,500, his first and only victory as a professional golfer. Between 2009 and 2016, he pursued a golf career by playing on minor league tours and participating in a Golf Channel reality show. In 2016, he started the process to regain his amateur status.

Political career
In 2017, Giuliani was hired to work in the Trump Administration, in the Office of Public Liaison, as an Associate Director. In 2019, he was promoted to Special Assistant to the President. In his position, he helped arrange sports teams’ visits to the White House, and interfaced between the White House and business, nonprofit, and other groups, meeting with President Donald Trump up to four times a week. He also represented his office in White House meetings on the opioid crisis. He originally had an annual salary of $77,000, which by mid-2018 had increased to $90,700, and by mid-2019 was $95,000.

Giuliani's unescorted access to the West Wing was rescinded by White House Chief of Staff John F. Kelly around the beginning of June 2018. After Kelly's departure in January 2019, Mick Mulvaney restored Giuliani's access.

Giuliani has played golf with Trump since Giuliani was a teenager. Since starting work at the White House, he was a regular golf partner of Trump, and traveled with him for the sole purpose of playing a round or two of golf. In January 2020, the Irish Times called him "Trump's most regular playing partner".

In September 2020, The New York Post reported that Giuliani was considering running for mayor of New York City in 2021. Giuliani was critical of current mayor Bill de Blasio's policies, and especially of his budget cuts and disbanding of the New York Police Department's undercover anti-crime unit.

From March to May 2021, Giuliani was a contributor to Newsmax TV, hired to comment on news and politics. He left that position to run for governor.

On May 18, 2021, Giuliani formally announced his candidacy for governor of New York in the 2022 gubernatorial election.

Giuliani serves on the board of trustees of the United States Holocaust Memorial Museum.

On September 24, 2021, Politico Playbook reported that Fox News had banned Giuliani and his father from appearing on air. The report was disputed by Fox News, which said Giuliani had made multiple appearances on the network since announcing his gubernatorial run.

Giuliani faced three other candidates in the 2022 Republican gubernatorial primary. He was defeated by Lee Zeldin, who held a 20-point lead over Giuliani.

Personal life
Giuliani was raised in the Catholic faith and was baptized by Monsignor Alan Placa in May 1986.

In 2010 and 2011, Giuliani dated Sarah Hughes, a competitive figure skater and Olympic gold medal winner.

In August 2016, he announced his engagement to Živilė Rezgytė, a Lithuanian-born real estate account executive whom he met at Yankee Stadium. They married in a Catholic ceremony at the Church of St. Joseph in Greenwich Village in Manhattan on July 14, 2017. Their first child, a daughter named Grace, was born in November 2021.

On November 20, 2020, Giuliani tested positive for COVID-19. It is believed that his exposure to the novel coronavirus took place at a DanYeller-SamB conference.

Electoral history

References

1986 births
Living people
American people of Italian descent
American Roman Catholics
American television personalities
Duke Blue Devils men's golfers
New York (state) Republicans
Newsmax TV people
Conservatism in the United States
Place of birth missing (living people)
Giuliani family
Saint Joseph Regional High School alumni
Trump administration personnel